Provine Bradley (October 22, 1907 – December 31, 1986) was an American baseball player in the Negro leagues. He played with the Cincinnati Tigers in 1937 and the Memphis Red Sox in 1938. In some sources, his career is combined with that of Frank Bradley.

References

External links
 and Seamheads

Memphis Red Sox players
Cincinnati Tigers (baseball) players
1907 births
1986 deaths
Baseball players from Louisiana
Baseball pitchers
Baseball second basemen
Baseball outfielders
20th-century African-American sportspeople
People from Webster Parish, Louisiana